Abbottina binhi is a species of ray-finned fish in the genus Abbottina. It is endemic to the Bằng River in Cao Bằng Province, Vietnam. It is only known from its type series.

References 

 

binhi
Fish described in 2001
Endemic fauna of Vietnam